Irving McNeil Ives (January 24, 1896 – February 24, 1962) was an American politician and founding dean of the Cornell University School of Industrial and Labor Relations. A Republican, he served as a United States Senator from New York from 1947 to 1959. He was previously a member of the New York State Assembly for sixteen years, serving as Minority Leader (1935), Speaker (1936), and Majority Leader (1937–1946). A liberal Republican, he was known as a specialist in labor and civil rights legislation. Ives voted in favor of the Civil Rights Act of 1957.

Early life and education
Irving Ives was born in Bainbridge, New York, to George Albert and Lucie Hough (née Keeler) Ives. His ancestors came from England to the United States, where they settled in Boston, Massachusetts in 1635; they later helped found Quinnipiac Colony in 1638, and lived in Vermont before moving to New York in 1795. His father worked in the coal and feed business. He received his early education at public schools in Bainbridge and Oneonta, graduating from Oneonta High School in 1914.

Ives attended Hamilton College for two years before enlisting in the U.S. Army following the entry of the United States into World War I in 1917. During the war, he served with the 5th Division in France and Germany, assigned primarily to the 61st Infantry Regiment. He participated in the Meuse-Argonne and Saint-Mihiel campaigns and was honorably discharged as a first lieutenant in 1919. He then resumed his studies at Hamilton, where he received a Bachelor of Arts degree in 1920 and graduated as a member of the Phi Beta Kappa Society.

Early career
Ives worked as a bank clerk for Guaranty Trust Company in New York City from 1920 to 1923, earning $25 per week. In 1920, he married Elizabeth Minette Skinner, to whom he remained married until her death in 1947; the couple had one son, George. Joining Manufacturers Trust Company in 1923, he was placed in charge of the bank's business activity in Upstate New York and subsequently moved to Norwich. He remained with Manufacturers Trust until 1930, when he entered the general insurance business in Norwich.

On February 18, 1930, Ives was elected to the New York State Assembly (Chenango Co.) to fill the vacancy caused by the resignation of Bert Lord. He was reelected many times and remained in the Assembly until 1946, sitting in the 153rd, 154th, 155th, 156th, 157th, 158th, 159th, 160th, 161st, 162nd, 163rd, 164th and 165th New York State Legislatures.

Ives was Minority Leader in 1935 and Speaker in 1936. His reelection as Speaker was opposed by his fellow liberal Republicans, who disagreed with his opposition to Governor Herbert H. Lehman's proposed social welfare program. Ives stepped aside in favor of Oswald D. Heck, who subsequently named Ives Majority Leader. He served in that position from 1937 to 1946.

From 1938 to 1946, Ives was chairman of the State Joint Legislative Committee on Industrial and Labor Conditions. In that position he earned nationwide attention for sponsoring the Ives-Quinn Act of 1945, the first state law to prohibit discrimination in employment on the basis of race, creed, color, or national origin. Ives also introduced legislation to create the state Department of Commerce and to establish the New York State School of Industrial and Labor Relations at Cornell University, of which he was dean from 1945 to 1947. He also served as a member of the New York State War Council (1942 – 1946), chairman of New York State Temporary Commission Against Discrimination (1944 – 1945), and chairman of the New York State Temporary Commission on Agriculture (1945 – 1946).

U.S. Senate
In 1946, when Democratic incumbent James M. Mead decided to run for Governor of New York, Ives successfully ran for Mead's seat in the United States Senate. He faced former Governor Lehman in the general election, during which he became the first Republican to be endorsed by the New York American Federation of Labor. He defeated Lehman by a margin of 52% to 47%. Ives was the first Republican to represent New York in the Senate since James W. Wadsworth Jr., who was defeated for reelection in 1926.

Despite his moderate reputation, Ives supported the Taft–Hartley Act in 1947 and voted to override President Harry S. Truman's veto of it; he subsequently lost his longstanding support from labor unions. He served as a delegate to the 1948 Republican National Convention in Philadelphia, Pennsylvania, which nominated his friend and fellow liberal New Yorker Thomas E. Dewey. That same year he married his longtime secretary, Marion Mead Crain.

Ives was elected to a second term in 1952, defeating Brooklyn borough president John Cashmore by 55% to 36%. He received the largest number of votes hitherto ever won by a candidate in New York, carrying all but three of the state's 62 counties. A strong supporter of General Dwight D. Eisenhower, he served as a delegate to the 1952 Republican National Convention in Chicago, Illinois.

In 1954, Ives unsuccessfully ran to succeed Dewey as governor of New York. In one of the closest gubernatorial elections in state history, he lost to Democrat W. Averell Harriman by 11,125 votes. Ives was a delegate to the 1956 Republican National Convention in San Francisco, California. In 1958, he co-sponsored a bill with Senator John F. Kennedy to correct abuses within organized labor as disclosed in hearings before the Rackets Committee.

Later life and death
In 1958, Ives declined to seek a third term in the Senate. He died at Chenango Memorial Hospital in Norwich, New York at age 66. He is buried at Greenlawn Cemetery in Bainbridge, New York.

Legacy
Ives is remembered with his desk in the permanent collections of the Chenango County Historical Society. Ives Hall at Cornell University is named for him.

References

External links

Guide to Irving Ives. Publications, 1943-1944, 1962. 5109m. Kheel Center for Labor-Management Documentation and Archives, Martin P. Catherwood Library, Cornell University.

 

1896 births
1962 deaths
American people of English descent
Republican Party United States senators from New York (state)
Republican Party members of the New York State Assembly
Hamilton College (New York) alumni
People from Bainbridge, New York
20th-century American politicians
Cornell University faculty